Miss Philippines Earth 2014 was the 14th edition of the Miss Philippines Earth pageant. It was held on May 11, 2014 at the Mall of Asia Arena in Pasay, Philippines. Angelee delos Reyes of Olongapo crowned Jamie Herrell of Cebu City at the end of the event. Herrell represented the Philippines at the Miss Earth 2014 pageant and won.

Results
Color keys

Awards

Special Awards

Sponsor Awards

Challenge Events

Fun For A Cause 
The winners are by region/ classification:

Environmental Seminar 
The winners are by group/ classification:

Trash to Class Challenge 
The winners are:

Cooking Challenge 
The winners are by group/ classification:

Swimsuit Competition 
It was held in Hamilo Coast. The winners are:

Hairstyling Challenge 
The winners are:

Catwalk Challenge 
The winners are:

Darling of the Press 
The winners are:

Beachwear Styling Challenge 
The winners are:

Resorts Wear Competition 
The winners are:

Evening Gown Challenge 
The winners are:

Talent 
 
For the Singing Category, the winners are:

 
For Dancing Category, the winners are:

 
For Creative Category, the winners are:

Make-up and Hair Challenge 
The winners are:

Swimsuit Competition 
The winners are:

Cultural Wear
The winners are:

Online Photogenic 
The winners are:

Eco- Beauty 
The winners are:

Delegates
The following is the official delegates of Miss Philippines Earth 2014 representing various cities, municipalities, provinces, and Filipino communities abroad:

References 

2014
2014 beauty pageants
2014 in the Philippines